Nationality words link to articles with information on the nation's poetry or literature (for instance, Irish or France).

Events

 Frederick James Furnivall founds the Browning Society

Works published in English

Canada
 Rosanna Eleanor Leprohon, Poetical Works, posthumously published, Canada
 Pamela Vining Yule. Poems of the Heart and Home.

United Kingdom
 Wilfrid Scawen Blunt, The Love Sonnets of Proteus (see also Sonnets and Songs 1875, Love Lyrics 1892)
 Katherine Harris Bradley and Edith Emma Cooper, writing as "Arran and Islan Leigh", Bellerophon, and Other Poems
 Amy Levy, Xantippe, and Other Verse
 George Moore, Pagan Poems
 Constance Naden, Songs and Sonnets of Springtime
 Christina Rossetti, A Pageant, and other Poems
 Dante Gabriel Rossetti, Ballads and Sonnets, with "The House of Life" complete, and Poems
 Oscar Wilde, Poems, three editions published this year, first edition in June

United States
 Thomas Bailey Aldrich, Friar Jerome's Beautiful Book
 Ina Coolbrith, A Perfect Day
 James T. Fields, Ballads and Other Verses, Boston: Houghton Mifflin & Company, Riverside Press imprint, United States
 Joel Chandler Harris, Uncle Remus: His Songs and His Sayings, including poetry
 Fitz-James O'Brien, Poems and Stories
 Epes Sargent, Harper's Cyclopaedia of British and American Poets (scholarship), posthumously published, United States
 John Greenleaf Whittier, The King's Missive

Works published in other languages
 François Coppée, Conies en tiers, France
 Victor Hugo, Les Quatres vents de l'esprit, France
 Jorge Isaacs, Saulo, 1st canto (no more published), Colombia
 Helena Nyblom, Digte ("Poems"), Denmark

Awards and honors

Births
Death years link to the corresponding "[year] in poetry" article:
 January 9 – Lascelles Abercrombie (died 1938), English poet and literary critic called the Georgian Laureate and one of the "Dymock poets"
 February 13 – Eleanor Farjeon (died 1965), English author and poet
 February 15 – Piaras Béaslaí (died 1965), Irish writer and poet
 February 17 – Puran Singh (died 1931), Indian, writing Indian poetry in English
 March 6 – John Cournos, born Ivan Grigorievich Korshun (died 1966), Russian-American Imagist poet, but better known for his novels, short stories, essays, criticism and translations of Russian literature (pen name: John Courtney)
 April 4 – Gertrud von Puttkamer, born Gertrud Günther (died 1944), German homoerotic poet (pen name: Marie-Madeleine)
 April 6 – Furnley Maurice (died 1942), Australian
 April 16 – Alice Corbin Henderson (died 1949), American poet
 May 18 – Alan Edward Mulgan (died 1962), New Zealand
 June 10 – Jaime Sabartés (died 1968), Catalan Spanish poet and longtime secretary to Pablo Picasso
 August 1 – Aizu Yaichi 会津 八一 (died 1956), Japanese poet, calligrapher and historian (surname: Aizu)
 August 10 – Witter Bynner (died 1968), American poet, writer and scholar
 August 20 – Edgar Albert Guest (died 1959), prolific American poet
 September 16 – Clive Bell (died 1964), English critic associated with the Bloomsbury group
 October 30 – Elizabeth Madox Roberts (died 1941), American novelist and poet
 November 15:
 Franklin Pierce Adams (died 1960), American columnist (pen name: F.P.A.), writer and wit, part of the Algonquin Round Table of the 1920s and 1930s whose newspaper column introduced the public to many poets and writers
 Masamune Atsuo 正宗敦夫 (died 1958), Japanese poet and academic (surname: Masamune)
 November 16 – Ernest O'Ferrall (died 1925), Australian poet and short-story writer (pen name: Kodak)
 December 8 – Padraic Colum (died 1972), Irish poet, novelist, dramatist, biographer, collector of folklore and a leading figure of the Celtic Revival
 December 24 – Lady Margaret Sackville (died 1963), English poet and children's author
 Also:
 Swami Ananda Acharya (died 1945), Indian poet who wrote Indian poetry in English
 Deepakba Desai (died 1955), Indian, Gujarati-language woman poet who wrote khandakavyas
 Ardoshir Faramji Kharbardar (died 1953), Indian, Gujarati-language, Parsi poet
 Sotiris Skipis (died 1951), Greek

Deaths
Birth years link to the corresponding "[year] in poetry" article:
 January 30 – Arthur O'Shaughnessy (born 1844), 36, British poet
 August 2 – Marcus Clarke (born 1846), 35, Australian novelist and poet
 September 7 – Sidney Lanier (born 1842), 39, American musician and poet
 October 12 – Josiah Gilbert Holland (born 1819), 62, American novelist and poet
 November 1 – Jacques Perk (born 1859), 22, Dutch poet
 November 4 – Estella Hijmans-Hertzveld (born 1837), 44, Dutch poet
 Also – Mangkunegara IV (born 1809), Javanese ruler of Mangkunegaran and poet

See also

 19th century in poetry
 19th century in literature
 List of years in poetry
 List of years in literature
 Victorian literature
 French literature of the 19th century
 Poetry

Notes

19th-century poetry
Poetry